The Regional Council of Burgundy was the deliberative assembly administering the Burgundy region until its merger in December 2015. The term can also, in a more restricted sense, designate the elected assembly which defined the policy of this community.The council was headquartered in Hôtel de Région in Dijon, at 17 boulevard de la Trémouille, next to Place de la République.

On 1 January 2016, date of the creation of the Bourgogne-Franche-Comté region, the Burgundy Regional Council was incorporated within the Regional Council of Bourgogne-Franche-Comté.

Composition 
The Burgundy Regional Council was chaired by François Patriat (PS) from 2004 until December 2015. He won by 52.65% of the votes cast in the second round of the regional election in 2010.

Presidents of the Regional Council

Vice Presidents (2010-2015)

References 

Burgundy
Burgundy